The 2017–18 Houston Cougars women's basketball team represented the University of Houston during the 2017–18 NCAA Division I women's basketball season. The season marked the fifth for the Cougars as members of the American Athletic Conference. The Cougars, led by fourth year head coach Ronald Hughey, played their home games at Health and Physical Education Arena due to renovations at Hofheinz Pavilion, which will be renamed Fertitta Center and will reopen during the 2018–19 season. They finished the season 20–12, 9–7 in The American play to finish in a tie for fifth place. They lost to Tulsa in the first round of the American Athletic Conference women's tournament. They received an at-large bid to the Women's National Invitation Tournament, where they lost to South Dakota.

Media
All Cougars games home and away are aired on the Houston Cougars IMG Sports Network, streamed online via the Houston Portal, with Gerald Sanchez and Louis Ray on the call. Before conference season home games streamed on Houston All-Access. Conference home games rotated between ESPN3, AAC Digital, and the Houston Portal. Road games typically streamed on the opponents' websites, though some conference road games also appeared on ESPN3 or AAC Digital.

Roster

Schedule and results

|-
! colspan="12" style="background:#c00; color:white;"| Non-conference regular season

|-
! colspan="12" style="background:#c00; color:white;"| AAC regular season

|-
! colspan="12" style="background:#c00; color:white;"| AAC Women's Tournament

|-
! colspan="12" style="background:#c00; color:white;"| WNIT

Rankings
2017–18 NCAA Division I women's basketball rankings

See also
 2017–18 Houston Cougars men's basketball team

References

External links
Official website

Houston Cougars women's basketball seasons
Houston
Houston
Houston Cougars
Houston Cougars